FC Belovodskoye is a Kyrgyzstani football club based in Belovodskoye, Kyrgyzstan that played in the top division in Kyrgyzstan, the Kyrgyzstan League. In 2006–2010 club was farm club of FC Abdish-Ata Kant.

History 
1993: Founded as FC Maksat Belovodskoye.
1999: Renamed to FC DinamoBelovodskoye.
2003: Renamed to FC Maksat Belovodskoye.
2006: Renamed to FC Pivo Belovodskoye.
2011: Renamed to FC Khimik Belovodskoye.
2013: Renamed to FC Belovodskoye.

Achievements 
Kyrgyzstan League:
16th place: 1993

Kyrgyzstan Cup:

Current squad

External links 
Career stats by KLISF
Profile at KLISF

Football clubs in Kyrgyzstan